Events from the year 1969 in Denmark.

Incumbents
 Monarch – Frederick IX
 Prime minister – Jens Otto Krag

Events
 20 February – The North Sea Continental Shelf cases are decided at the International Court of Justice.
 10 March – The Danish Technical Museum is inaugurated in Helsingør.
 8 May – The Museum of Medical History is inaugurated in Bredgade in Copenhagen.
 28 May – The LO School is inaugurated by the Danish labour movement in Helsingør.
 15 June – The 750 years' anniversary of the Danish flag, Dannebrog, is celebrated throughout Denmark. 750 flags from all parts of Denmark are gathered on City Hall Square in Copenhagen.
 24 June – The proposed lowering of the electoral age from 21 to 18 is rejected by 78.6% of voters at the 1969 Danish electoral age referendum.
 1 July – Denmark legalizes visual pornography.
 30 September – The government sets up a temporary Environmental Committee.
 15 November – An estimated 20,000 people attend an anti-Vietnam War demonstration in Copenhagen, marching from Østerbro Barracks to Christiansborg by way of the American Embassy.

Full date missing
 The Danish Liberal Centre Party is dissolved.

Sport

Cycling
 22-24 August  Leif Mortensen wins gold in Men's amateur road race and Denmark wins silver in Men's team time trial at the 1969 UCI Road World Championships.

Football
 Boldklubben 1903 wins the 1969 Danish 1st Division in football.

Music
 First performance in Denmark of Rued Langgaard's Music of the Spheres, 51 years after it was composed.

Births
 7 February – Chris Minh Doky, jazz bassist, composer, producer
 19 May – Thomas Vinterberg, film director
 7 June – Prince Joachim, second son of Crown Princess Margrethe.

Deaths
 2 January – Julius Bomholt, politician (born 1896)
 12 February – Victor Gram, politician (born 1910)
 16 December – Leo Mathisen, jazz pianist, singer (born 1906)
 26 December  – Gundorph Albertus, silversmith (born 1887)

See also
1969 in Danish television

References

 
Denmark
Years of the 20th century in Denmark
1960s in Denmark